Love Lasts Forever may refer to:
 "Love Lasts Forever" (All Saints song)
 "Love Lasts Forever" (Kissing the Pink song)
 "Love Lasts Forever" (Virgin Prunes song)